Christina Große (born 23 September 1970) is a German actress. She has appeared in more than seventy films since 1995. In 2015, she was nominated for the Grimme Prize Special in the productions Neufeld, mitkommen! (WDR), Spreewald crime thriller: MörderischeWärme (ZDF), Be my Baby (ZDF) and other productions from the 2014 broadcast year.

Selected filmography

References

External links
 
 Agency profile

1970 births
Living people
German film actresses
German television actresses